Thibaw Min, also Thebaw or Theebaw (1 January 1859 – 19 December 1916) was the last king of the Konbaung dynasty of Burma (Myanmar) and also the last Burmese monarch in the country's history. His reign ended when the forces of the Burmese Empire were defeated by the forces of the British Empire in the Third Anglo-Burmese War, on 29 November 1885, prior to its official annexation on 1 January 1886.

Early life

Prince Thibaw was born Maung Yay Set, the son of King Mindon and one of his consorts, Laungshe Mibaya. Thibaw's mother had been banished from the palace court by Mindon and spent her final years as a thilashin, a kind of female Burmese Buddhist renunciant. During the early years of his life, Thibaw studied Buddhist texts at a kyaung to win his father's favor. He passed the Pahtamabyan religious examinations and gained respect and recognition from his father and the chief queen.

One of Mindon's chief consorts, the Queen of the Middle Palace, Hsinbyumashin, helped to broker a marriage between her second daughter, Supayalat and Thibaw, who were half-siblings by blood.

Accession

In 1878, Thibaw succeeded his father in a bloody succession massacre. Hsinbyumashin, one of Mindon's queens, had grown dominant at the Mandalay court during Mindon's final days. Under the guise that Mindon wanted to bid his children (other princes and princesses) farewell, Hsinbyumashin had all royals of close age (who could potentially be heir to the throne) mercilessly slaughtered by edict, to ensure that Thibaw and her daughter Supayalat would assume the throne.

At the time of his accession, Lower Burma, half of the kingdom's former territory, had been under British occupation for thirty years and it was no secret that the King intended to regain this territory. Relations had soured during the early 1880s when the King was perceived as having made moves to align his country with the French more closely. Relations deteriorated further in an incident later called "The Great Shoe Question", where visiting British dignitaries refused to remove their shoes before entering the royal palace and were subsequently banished.

At the time, the kingdom's treasury reserves had diminished, forcing the government to increase taxation on the peasants. In 1878, the national lottery was also introduced on a trial basis, which became popular but soon went awry, with many families losing their livelihoods. The lottery experiment was ended in 1880.

In October to November 1878, a meeting at Mandalay Palace's North Garden significantly expanded the size of the Hluttaw from four departments to 14:
Agriculture
Public works
Land warfare
Taxation
Religious knowledge
Royal estate management
Sassamedha (Personal taxes)
Criminal justice
Civil justice
Water-borne warfare
Foreign affairs
Partnerships
Town and village affairs
Mechanised industries

During King Thibaw's reign, a new administrative unit, the district (khayaing), based on the administrative units of British India, was created, in order to centralize administration from the court. Altogether, the kingdom was divided into 10 districts and administrated by district ministers, who had authority over smaller administrative units, the villages and towns. Thibaw also rolled back the conversion of local administrators from myo-thugyi to myo-ok, which had been part of administrative reforms carried out by Mindon, based on the prevailing administrative system in Lower Burma.

A proclamation issued by the court of King Thibaw in 1885 which called on his countrymen to liberate Lower Burma was used by the British as pretext that he was a tyrant who reneged on his treaties and they decided to complete the conquest they had started in 1824. The invasion force which consisted of 11,000 men, a fleet of flat-bottomed boats and elephant batteries, was led by General Harry Prendergast.

Abdication

British troops quickly reached the royal capital of Mandalay with little opposition. Within twenty-four hours, the troops had marched to the Mandalay Palace to demand the unconditional surrender of Thibaw and his kingdom within twenty-four hours. At the time, the king and queen had retired to a summer house in the palace gardens.

The following morning, King Thibaw was forced on a bullock cart, along with his family, and proceeded to a steamer on the Irrawaddy River, in the presence of a huge crowd of subjects.

Life in exile
After abdicating the throne, Thibaw, his wife Supayalat and two infant daughters were coerced by British authority to Ratnagiri, India, a port city off the Arabian Sea. During their first 24 years in India, Thibaw's family lived at Outram Hall, in Dharangaon, inland from Ratanagiri, but in 1906 the Government agreed to spend over 125,000 rupees (c £9000) to construct a new official residence (Source: W S Desai: "Deposed King Thibaw" (1967) p. 72). The family then moved into a grand two-story brick building, colloquially "Thibaw's Palace," built of laterite and lava rock, on a  property.

The Government of India initially gave Thibaw an annual allowance varying between 35,000 and 42,000 rupees.  This was increased in 1906 to 100,000 rupees (c £7000) (Source: Desai ibid p. 62).  He was reportedly reclusive and did not leave the property during his time in Ratanagiri, but he sponsored local festivals, particularly during Diwali. He died at age 57 on 15 December 1916 and was buried at a small walled plot adjacent to a Christian cemetery, along with one of his consorts, Hteiksu Phaya Galay.

 
The surviving exiled royal family were relocated to Burma in 1919 after the king's death. The first born daughter, Myat Phaya Gyi, returned to Ratnagiri despite the royal family's opposition. She had a romance with the Indian driver, Gopal Sawant, during exile which had resulted in a daughter, Tutu. Gyi and Tutu lived in poverty and survived by making paper flowers to sell on the markets because Sawant took all of her pension from the British government; he did however buy them a house. Tutu went on to live in poverty and had 11 children who never knew their past until recent interest in the royal family.
The second daughter, Myat Phaya Lat, became the pretender to the throne and married her father's private secretary, Khin Maung Lat, who also was his nephew. They did not have any children but Lat adopted her Nepalese maidservant's son.
The third daughter, Myat Phaya, went on to marry twice. Her first marriage was to a Burmese prince, Hteik Tin Kodawgyi, whom she had a daughter with, Phaya Rita, and after their divorce she got remarried with a Burmese lawyer, Mya U. Phaya Rita married her cousin, Taw Phaya, son of Myat Phaya Galay.
The fourth daughter, Myat Phaya Galay, married a former Burmese monk, Ko Ko Naing, and had six children one of whom was pretender to the throne, Taw Phaya, who married his cousin, Phaya Rita, daughter of Myat Phaya.
Both the third and fourth daughter were born in India but died in Burma and two of their children married each other, pretender to the throne Taw Phaya and princess Phaya Rita, they had seven children thus securing the true royal family line.

Renewed interest
In December 2012, the president of Burma Thein Sein paid homage at the tomb of the king in Ratnagiri and met the late monarch's descendants. He was the first head of Burmese government to visit the grave. He also visited the former royal palace at Ratnagiri.

Family
 Parents:
 Mindon Min
 Laungshe Mibaya
 Consorts and children:
 Supayalat
 Myat Phaya Gyi
Myat Phaya Lat
 Myat Phaya
 Myat Phaya Galay
 2 sons (unnamed)
 Supayagyi
 Supayalay (junior queen)

References

 The Baldwin Project: Growth of the British Empire by M. B. Synge at www.mainlesson.com
 Political Topics And Discussion > Who Really Killed General Aung San? at www.bearpit.net

Bibliography

 Candier, Aurore (December 2011). "Conjuncture and Reform in the Late Konbaung Period". Journal of Burma Studies 15 (2).

 Desai, W. S.  Deposed King Thibaw of Burma in India 1885-1916 (1967
 

 Myint-U, Thant (2001). The Making of Modern Burma. Cambridge University Press. pp. 9780521799140.
 Scott, J. George, ed. (1901). Gazetteer of Upper Burma and the Shan States. 1. Rangoon: Government of Burma.
 Shah, Sudha. The King in Exile: The Fall of the Royal Family of Burma (2012)

Links

1859 births
1916 deaths
Konbaung dynasty
Monarchs who abdicated
People of the Third Anglo-Burmese War
People from Mandalay
Burmese Buddhist monarchs
19th-century Burmese monarchs